Harbin Symphony Orchestra (哈尔滨交响乐团; English translation, Harbin Symphony Orchestra) is a Chinese symphony orchestra based in Harbin, Heilongjiang, China.  The orchestra's home is the Harbin Concert Hall.

History 
The Harbin Symphony Orchestra (formerly Chinese Eastern Railway Club Symphony Orchestra) was created in 1908 on the Orchestra of Russian TRANS-AMUR Railway Corps Brigade after their performance of 1812 Overture which is considered as the first symphony concert in China.
2011, with the inauguration of the new Harbin Concert Hall, the orchestra moved in to the new venue and started to plan annual concert seasons.
In 2016, the Harbin Symphony Orchestra and the Israel Philharmonic Orchestra have performed two concerts conducted by Zubin Mehta.

Direction 
 Art director: Tang Muhai
 Executive director: Qu Bo
 Chief conductor: Yu Xuefeng
 Guest chief conductor: Harmen Cnossen

See also
Harbin Concert Hall

References

Musical groups established in 1908
China orchestras
Organizations based in Harbin
Culture in Heilongjiang
1908 establishments in China